Statistics of Nadeshiko League Cup in the 2010 season.

Overview
Nippon TV Beleza won the championship.

Results

Qualifying round

Group A

Group B

Final round

Semifinals
Urawa Reds Ladies 3-2 INAC Kobe Leonessa
Nippon TV Beleza 1-0 TEPCO Mareeze

Final
Urawa Reds Ladies 2-3 Nippon TV Beleza

References

Nadeshiko League Cup
2010 in Japanese women's football